Günther Schramm (born 18 February 1929) is a German film and television actor. In 1958 he married the actress Gudrun Thielemann.

Selected filmography
 The Ambassador (1960)
 The Happy Years of the Thorwalds (1962)
 Snow White and the Seven Jugglers (1962)
 Zur Hölle mit den Paukern (1968)
 Death and Diamonds (1968)
 The Heath Is Green (1972)

Television appearances
 Der Kommissar
 Das Traumschiff

References

External links
 

1929 births
Living people
20th-century German male actors
21st-century German male actors
German male film actors
German male television actors
People from Potsdam